Abel Christmas Davies (1861 – 18 June 1914) was a Welsh international rugby union wing who played club rugby for London Welsh and international rugby for Wales. Davies was a tall but powerful wing, and was noted as being able to sprint the 100 yards in exactly ten seconds.

Rugby career
Davies came to note as a rugby player when representing London Welsh, while studying medicine in London. He was part of the London Welsh team which face the touring New Zealand Natives in February 1889. Although London Welsh lost 2-1, Davies scored the try against the Maoris.

It was while playing for London Welsh that Davies was selected to represent Wales as part of the 1889 Home Nations Championship; becoming the third player from the club to be chosen for their country that season. The other representatives being Rowley Thomas and Martyn Jordan. Davies made his Wales debut on 2 March, at St Helen's in a game against Ireland. Captained by Wales legendary player Arthur 'Monkey' Gould, Davies was one of three players to make just a single-cap appearance during the game, along with Llanelli's Giotto Griffiths and Thomas Morgan. The Irish won the game by two ties to nil and was the first Irish win in Wales. Davies lost his position in the next season to Percy Lloyd and was never selected for Wales again.

International matches played
Wales
  1889

Bibliography

References 

1861 births
1914 deaths
19th-century Welsh medical doctors
20th-century Welsh medical doctors
Llanelli RFC players
London Welsh RFC players
Rugby union players from Narberth
Rugby union wings
Wales international rugby union players
Welsh rugby union players